Pingré may refer to:

People
Alexandre Guy Pingré (1711–1796), French astronomer and naval geographer

Space
12719 Pingré, main belt asteroid with an orbital period of 1272
Pingré (crater), lunar impact crater near the southwest limb of the Moon

See also
Pingree (disambiguation)